Seth Flowerman (born c. 1985) is the President & CEO of PLT Health Solutions. He is an entrepreneur who formed his first company while in high school.

Early life and education
Flowerman attended the Pingry School. He earned a B.S. from Cornell University in 2008 and an MBA from the S.C. Johnson Graduate School of Management in 2009. He was a member of Sigma Phi and Sphinx Head at Cornell.

Career
At age 16, Flowerman founded Career Explorations, a program that sets American college and high school students up with internships in Boston, Chicago, London, Los Angeles, New York City, and San Francisco . Four years later, he founded Vertex Academic Services, a test preparation provider and educational consulting company in Manhattan. Vertex was acquired in 2011 by A List Education. Career Explorations was acquired in 2010 by Musiker Discovery Programs and Dream Careers Inc. and now operates under the name Discovery Internships.

Awards
2004: Student Entrepreneur of the Year, Junior Achievement
2007: Kaplan Most Promising Campus CEOs
2008: BusinessWeek's 25 Entrepreneurs under 25
2008: Social Impact Award, Global Student Entrepreneurship Awards

References

External links
 Career Explorations
 Vertex Academic Services

1986 births
Living people
21st-century American businesspeople
People from Morristown, New Jersey
Samuel Curtis Johnson Graduate School of Management alumni